The 2021 Gloucestershire County Council election took place on 6 May 2021 alongside other local elections. All 53 seats to Gloucestershire County Council were up for election. The Conservatives retained their majority, albeit a smaller one than in 2017.

Background and election campaign 

In the 2017 Gloucestershire County Council election, the Conservatives won overall control of the council.

At the 2019 United Kingdom general election, the Labour Party lost their only parliamentary seat in Gloucestershire.

Before the election, the council consisted of 28 Conservatives, 13 Liberal Democrats, 5 Labour (4 being Labour Co-op), 2 Green, 1 People Against Bureaucracy, 3 Independents and 1 vacant seat.

There was some controversy over alleged delivery of election material and campaigning due to the ongoing COVID-19 pandemic in the United Kingdom. One candidate in the election was reported to the Gloucestershire Constabulary for allegedly breaching lockdown regulations but she denied this and claimed that the leaflets were not election related. The Liberal Democrats in the county claimed that it was a politically motivated attack on their campaign by the Conservative Party.

Council composition

Summary

Election result

|-

Results by Division

Cheltenham

Cotswold

Forest of Dean

Gloucester

Stroud

Tewkesbury

References 

Gloucestershire County Council elections
2021 English local elections
2020s in Gloucestershire